Levensau may refer to:

Levensau (river), a small river in Schleswig-Holstein, Germany
Levensau High Bridge, a bridge spanning the Kiel Canal
SS Frontier (1922), a cargo ship briefly named Levensau in 1945